Donald Lucas is a trombone artist and educator. He is an associate professor and Brass, Woodwind & Percussion department chair at the Boston University School of Music and served as president of the International Trombone Association.

Honors and achievements
Lucas, a Fulbright Scholar, is the recipient of the Premier Prix at the Guildhall School of Music and Drama; he is the only brass musician ever to receive this prize.  Lucas also has received the Bronze Medal L'unamite, Toulon International Solo Competition; First Place "Fellow", Harmony Ridge Brass Festival; first place solo and group competitions, National Christian Artists Seminar; first prize winner, ITA Frank Smith Trombone Solo Competition; and first prize, the American Classic Trombone Quartet, Summit Brass International Brass Chamber Group Competition.  Lucas has performed under notable conductors Leonard Slatkin, Iván Fischer, John Adams, Hugh Wolf, and Christopher Hogwood.

Lucas has also commissioned and premiered many works by composers Theodore Antoniou, Gary D. Belshaw, Derek Bourgeouis, Jacques Casterede, Franz Cibulka, Adam Gorb, Alun Hoddinott, Elena Roussanova Lucas, David Maslanka, Daniel Schnyder, and Fisher Tull.

Performance and teaching

International
Lucas has led masterclasses and performed recitals internationally, including:

United Kingdom
The British Trombone Society Festival
Guildhall School of Music and Drama
Chetham’s School of Music
Repton Brass Festival
Royal Academy of Music
Royal Northern College of Music
The Royal Scottish Academy of Music
Wigmore Hall
Nottingham Trent University

Russia
Moscow Conservatory
Saint Petersburg Conservatory
Fine Arts Institute – Vladivostok

Other international engagements
Korean Trombone Festival
Brazilian Trombone and Tuba Association Festival
Paris Conservatory
Trombones de Costa Rica International Brass Festival
International Trombone Festival – 1996 (Feldkirch, Austria)
International Trombone Symposium (Melbourne, Australia)

United States
In addition to serving on the faculties of Boston University, Texas Tech University, Eastern New Mexico University, and Sam Houston State University, Lucas has taught numerous master classes and has given many performance across the country at venues such as Weill Recital Hall at Carnegie Hall, the Juilliard School, Terrace Theatre at the Kennedy Center, the Eastman School of Music, the United States Army Band "Pershing's Own", the West Point United States Military Academy Band, the United States Naval Academy Band, the Midwest Band and Orchestra Clinic, the MasterWorks Festival, the New York Conference of Brass Scholarships, the Eastern Trombone Workshop, 76 Trombones + 4 Trombones Festival, Harmony Ridge Brass Festival, College Band Directors National Association Convention, the Texas Bandmasters Association Convention, the Texas Music Educators Association Convention, the Christian Artists Music Festival, the Las Vegas Music Festival, the Boston University Tanglewood Institute, and dozens of appearances at universities, festivals, camps, and schools.

Education
Lucas attended the University of North Texas College of Music, Texas Tech University (BM, MM), the University of Houston (DMA work), and the Guildhall School of Music and Drama (Advanced Solo Studies Diploma).  His principal teachers include Denis Wick, Robert Deahl, Al Lube, Carsten Svanberg, Phil Wilson, Michel Becquet, Allen Barnhill, John Marcellus, Leon Brown, and Dave Maser.

Discography
Lucas has released two solo albums: Hymns for Trombone and Cantabile both showcase his lyrical style.  He can also be heard on recordings with the Saint Paul Chamber Orchestra and the American Wind Symphony Orchestra.  He has recorded solo and chamber music for North South Recordings and Warwick Music Publishers.

References

External links
 Don Lucas biography at Boston University
 Online Don Lucas masterclass given at the Eastern Trombone Workshop 2007
 Lucas performing with The Concord Band

Year of birth missing (living people)
Place of birth missing (living people)
Living people
American trombonists
Male trombonists
University of North Texas College of Music alumni
21st-century trombonists
21st-century American male musicians